The Black Canyon Wilderness of Oregon is a wilderness area in the Ochoco National Forest.  It is within the drainage basin of the South Fork John Day River.  It lies in Grant and Wheeler counties in Oregon.  The nearest city is Paulina, in Crook County.  It was established in 1984 and encompasses .

Topography

Flora and fauna

Much of the Black Canyon Wilderness consists of a dry sagebrush environment, but ponderosa pine, mountain mahogany, juniper, and fir forests can also be explored.

A wide range of vegetative conditions in the wilderness provide habitat for nearly 300 different species of wildlife, including black bear, cougar, deer, elk, and rattlesnake.  steelhead trout can be found in perennial streams, which they use for spawning. Wildflowers such as crimson columbine, lupine, and Indian paintbrush flourish throughout the wilderness.

See also 
 List of Oregon Wildernesses
 List of U.S. Wilderness Areas
 Wilderness Act

References

External links
 Black Canyon Wilderness - Deschutes & Ochoco National Forests
 Black Canyon Wilderness - Public Lands Information Center

Wilderness areas of Oregon
Protected areas of Grant County, Oregon
Protected areas of Wheeler County, Oregon
Ochoco National Forest
1984 establishments in Oregon
Protected areas established in 1984